Cochylimorpha perturbatana is a species of moth of the family Tortricidae. It is found in China (Xinjiang) and Russia.

The wingspan is 20–27 mm. Adults have been recorded from wing from July to August.

References

 
 

P
Moths of Asia
Moths described in 1900